Education in Hong Kong used to be largely modelled on that of the United Kingdom, particularly the English system. Since 2012, the overhaul of secondary school diploma has introduced changes to the number of school years as well as the two-tier general examinations. The DSE has replaced the old HKCEE (similar to the UK's GCSE) and the A-levels. Education policy in Hong Kong is overseen by the Education Bureau and the Social Welfare Department.

The academic year begins mid-year, usually starting in September.

History 
Small village Chinese schools were observed by the British missionaries when they arrived circa 1843. Anthony Sweeting believes those small village schools existed in Chek Chue (modern-day town of Stanley), Shek Pai Wan, Heung Kong Tsai (modern-day Aberdeen) and Wong Nai Chong on Hong Kong Island, although proof is no longer available.

One of the earliest schools with reliable records was Li Ying College established in 1075 in present-day New Territories. By 1860 Hong Kong had 20 village schools. Chinese who were wealthy did not educate their children in Hong Kong but instead sent them to major Chinese cities, such as Canton, for traditional Chinese education.

The changes came with the arrival of the British in 1841. At first, Hong Kong's education came from Protestant and Catholic missionaries who provided social services. Italian missionaries began to provide boy-only education to British and Chinese youth in 1843.

In 1862 Frederick Stewart arrived in Hong Kong. His work, over a period of years, led to his being called, "The Founder of Hong Kong Education". He took up an appointment as the first headmaster of the first school to be founded and fully-funded by the Hong Kong Government, Queen's College (then named the Hong Kong Government Central School for Boys). He took a lead from various missionaries who had been active in Hong Kong education for the Chinese in the earlier post 1841 period and insisted on a bilingual and bicultural curriculum. (Half the day was spent on the Chinese language and the traditional Confucian curriculum and half the day was spent on the English language and what was then known as "useful knowledge" (i.e. western studies).

One of the much-contested debates was whether schools should offer Vernacular education, teaching in Chinese. Education was considered a luxury for the elite and the rich. The first school to open the floodgate of western medical practice into East Asia was the Hong Kong College of Medicine for Chinese. The London Missionary Society and Sir James Cantlie started the Hong Kong College of Medicine for Chinese in 1887 (although, the 'for Chinese' was later dropped from the name).  Also, the London Missionary Society founded Ying Wa Girls' School in 1900. Belilios Public School was a girls' secondary school founded in 1890 – the first government school in Hong Kong that provided bilingual education in English and Chinese. The push for Chinese education in a British system did not begin until the rise of social awareness of the Chinese community following the 1919 May Fourth Movement and the 1934 New Life Movement in China. Educating the poor did not become a priority until they accounted for the majority of the population. Financial issues were addressed in the 1970s.

In 1997 Keith Richburg of The Washington Post wrote that in the British era education was based on education in the United Kingdom, "largely apolitical", and did not emphasise topics related to politics nor civic affairs. The Governor of Hong Kong had the right to bar, under law, "the dissemination of information, or expression of opinion, of a clearly biased political nature in schools" but Richburg stated that "That law was rarely used". There were attempts to repeal said law prior to 1 July 1997. By 1991 the education authorities wanted to have history classes with a positive view of China to make the handover smoother but some teachers with liberal views sought to have more critical views.

In 1997, the Hong Kong Special Administrative Region implemented the Target Oriented Curriculum (TOC) to introduce and spread the project learning in the national primary schools. To promote the interactions of work groups or individual students in a new learning environment, professors were engaged in the role of "consultant, facilitator, helper" and posers of questions. Ten years after, the 80% of the Hong Kong's institutes had left the traditional approach to education, mainly based on teachers and textbooks, to adopt an active and experiential learning pedagogy.

A small group of South Asian Hongkongers marched through Central demanding more schooling in the English language on 3 June 2007.

On 2 September 2019, thousands of secondary school students joined a boycott organized by the local party Demosisto against the extradition bill to China. Students striked and formed a 650-meter human chain. Six of them kneeled down in front of the St Francis' Canossian College, the mother institute of the Chief Executive Carrie Lam, to urge "", a demand that had originated during the 13 consecutive weeks of mass protests.

The imposition of the Hong Kong National Security Law (NSL) on 1 July 2020 resulted in a decline in enrollment in traditionally prestigious Hong Kong schools, as many families with the financial means chose instead to send their children abroad. A survey covering 100 schools indicated that from July to November of that year, these schools lost about 1,474 students with about 50% leaving Hong Kong with other members of their families.

By 2020, mention of the Tiananmen massacre of 1989 was omitted from most new Hong Kong textbooks. By 2022, the government had introduced further authoritarian measures, ordering that foreign teachers working in Hong Kong must take an oath of allegiance. New middle school textbooks denied that Hong Kong was ever a colony, conforming to President Xi's position on the matter. The new textbooks also stated that the recent Hong Kong protests had been caused by foreign parties. Liberal studies classes were refocused on patriotism and national security, including a new National Security Education Day on April 15.

In January 2023, figures were released for 2021-2022 which showed a record number of students who left Hong Kong universities before finishing their degrees, and a more than 20 year high of lecturers who left their posts. In February 2023, reports showed that around 3,500 teachers in subsidized schools left in the last academic year, with most resigning rather than retiring.

Pre-school education

Pre-school education in Hong Kong is not free, in principle, and fees are payable by pupils' parents. However, parents whose children have the right of abode in Hong Kong can pay for part of their fees with a voucher from the government under the Pre-primary Education Voucher Scheme (PEVS). In 2013, the amount of subsidy under the PEVS is $16,800.

Primary and secondary education

Every child in Hong Kong, without any reasonable excuse, is required by law to attend a primary school after the child has attained the age of 6. They are also required to attend a secondary school after primary education and is completed before he/she attains the age of 18. However, a student who has completed Form 3 of secondary education and whose parent can produce evidence to the satisfaction of the Permanent Secretary for Education, shall not apply. Education in the public sector is free. Public primary schools admit students via the Primary One Admission System.

School years

Secondary education

Secondary education is separated into junior and senior years. In junior years, the curriculum is a broad one where history, geography, science are studied alongside subjects that have already been studied at primary schools. In senior years, this becomes more selective and students have a choice over what and how much is to be studied. Almost all schools but PLK Vicwood KT Chong Sixth Form College and its feeder junior secondary college have both sessions.

Annually, Form 6 students studying in local schools in Hong Kong sit for the Hong Kong Diploma of Secondary Education (HKDSE) between early March through early May. However, a minority of local secondary schools in Hong Kong also offer the International Baccalaureate Diploma Program (IBDP) for their students as an alternative choice to the HKDSE curriculum, for example, Diocesan Boys' School and St. Paul's Co-educational College.

Further education

The commerce stream in secondary schools is considered vocational. Students in the Commerce stream would usually enter the workplace to gain practical work experience by this point. Further education pursuits in the Hong Kong Institute of Vocational Education or universities abroad are common. The Manpower Development Committee (MDC) advises the government on coordination, regulation, and promotion of the sector. Also, the Vocational Training Council (VTC) ensures the level of standard is met through the "Apprentice Ordinance". The VTC also operates three skills-centres for people with disabilities. secondary schools in Hong Kong are going to be cut down to only two years due to the switch in the government.

Alternative education options

International institutions provide both primary and secondary education in Hong Kong. International institutions like schools within the English Schools Foundation, Li Po Chun United World College, Hong Kong International School, American International School Hong Kong, Chinese International School, Victoria Shanghai Academy German Swiss International School, Canadian International School, Hong Kong Japanese School, Hong Kong Academy, French International School, Yew Chung International School, Po Leung Kuk Choi Kai Yau School, Singapore International School, Mount Kelly Hong Kong and Harrow International School Hong Kong teach with English as the primary language, with some sections bilingual in German, French and Chinese. International school students rarely take Hong Kong public exams. British students take GCSE, IGCSE, and A-levels. US students take APs. Increasingly, international schools follow the International Baccalaureate Diploma Programme (IBDP) and enter universities through non-JUPAS direct entry. International students apply on a per-school basis, whereas Hong Kong local students submit 1 application for multiple local universities as a JUPAS applicant.

Medium of instruction 
In 1990s, following the handover of Hong Kong, most secondary schools in the territory switched their medium of instruction from English to Chinese (Cantonese). The remaining 114 schools (about 20-30%) are known as EMI schools and are often viewed as prestigious. EMI schools also have far better university acceptance rates than CMI schools, hence EMI schools are heavily sought after by parents and are often labelled as 'elite schools'. From 2009 onwards, schools which use Chinese as medium of instruction were also allowed to have classes that use English as medium of instruction.

In addition, the Hong Kong government has pushed the use of Putonghua (Standard Mandarin Chinese) as medium of instruction in the Chinese language subject (PMIC). As of 2015-2016, about 16.4% primary schools and 2.5% secondary schools have adopted Putonghua, instead of Cantonese, for teaching the Chinese language subject across all grades and classes. An additional 55.3% primary schools and 34.4% secondary schools have adopted Putonghua in some of their grades and classes. The remaining 28.3% primary schools and 63.1% secondary schools still use Cantonese in all their grades and classes.

Tertiary and Higher education

Higher education remains exclusive in Hong Kong. Fewer than 20,000 students are offered places funded by the government every year, although this number has more than doubled over the last three decades.

As a result, many continue their studies abroad, as can be seen in the following table.

Bachelor's degrees issued in Hong Kong have honours distinctions: first class, second class upper division, second class lower division, and third class.

Adult education

Adult education is popular, since it gives middle age adults a chance to obtain a tertiary degree. The concept was not common several decades ago. The EMB has commissioned two non-profit school operators to provide evening courses. The operators have fee remission schemes to help adult learners in need of financial assistance. Adult education courses also provide Vocational Training Council through universities and private institutions. The Open University of Hong Kong is one establishment for mature students. Several secondary schools operate adult education sessions, the first being Cheung Sha Wan Catholic Secondary School, while PLK Vicwood KT Chong Sixth Form College offers associate degree and joint-degree programmes.

Special education

However, since special education is accused of being a measure of discrimination and separation, the British education suggests that integrated education should be the leading factor, and many special schools will be forced to transform. Since the 2000s, special schools in Hong Kong have also followed this trend, except for moderately to severely intellectual disability students, other types of special schools need to be transformed into mainstream schools to accept ordinary students.

Education for immigrant and non-Cantonese-speaking children

The Education Bureau provides education services for immigrant children from Mainland China and other countries, as well as non-Cantonese-speaking Hong Kong children. Free "Induction Programmes" of up to 60 hours have been offered to NAC by non-government organisations. The EMB also provides a 6-month full-time "Initiation Programme" incorporating both academic and non-academic support services, for NAC before they are formally placed into mainstream schools. The social issue aroused the interest of academic researchers to publish work about NACs' adaptation and school performance

In 2017 the Hong Kong government schools had 6,267 Pakistani students, the largest non-local bloc, and 818 white students of any national background. In 2013 there were 556 white students of any background in Hong Kong government schools. Historically non-local students from other Asian countries attended government schools while white students attended private schools instead. In 2018 Angie Chan of The New York Times reported that increasing numbers of white students were enrolling in Cantonese medium government schools. This was due to increasing tuitions from international schools which received influxes of wealthy Mainland Chinese and desires from parents for white students to learn Cantonese.

International education

As of January 2015, the International Schools Consultancy (ISC) listed Hong Kong as having 175 international schools. ISC defines an 'international school' in the following terms "ISC includes an international school if the school delivers a curriculum to any combination of pre-school, primary or secondary students, wholly or partly in English outside an English-speaking country, or if a school in a country where English is one of the official languages, offers an English-medium curriculum other than the country's national curriculum and is international in its orientation." This definition is used by publications including The Economist.

While the ISC definition allows for an objective number it does also mean that the count of "International Schools" is often considerably higher than the number of schools that would be relevant to an international, expatriate audience. WhichSchoolAdvisor.com, a review based site that looks exclusively at schools attended by expatriates, has 100 international schools listed in its directory, less than the ISC count, but still 17 more than its great city rival, Singapore. Of these 24 schools follow in part or in full a UK based curriculum (largely the I/GCSE up to 16, A Level post 16), while others follow a UK/International Baccalaureate blend with the IB Diploma offered for post-16 study. Some 33 schools in Hong Kong currently offer the Diploma.

Hong Kong's international schools are not subject to independent inspection reports by the territory's regulator, meaning word of mouth tends to drive reputation as to what are considered to be the best performing international schools in the territory. A large number of parent forums exist that help parents new to Hong Kong make an often very difficult decision.

Private, international schools come at very different prices. The most expensive school is currently Li Po Chun United World College of Hong Kong, with average annual fees of HKD $360,000 (USD $46,450.13). These fees are skewed by the fact that this school is boarding only, and only for the students studying the last two years of the IB. The next most expensive school in the territory is the Chinese International School (CIS), an IB continuum, bi-lingual school (Mandarin and English). Its average fees across year groups is currently HKD 216,500 (USD $27,935).

In 2018 Angie Chan reported that increasing numbers of Chinese students, including Hong Kong Chinese and Mainland Chinese, were enrolling in private international schools. In 2017 the percentage of foreign students in such institutions was under 75%, with Hong Kong Chinese being 21.6% and Mainland Chinese being about 4%. In previous eras virtually the entire international school student body was foreign.

There are top-rated exempted courses where courses offered overseas are collaborated with local institutions in Hong Kong to broaden the scope of Tertiary Education in Hong Kong. MIT has an innovation node in Hong Kong.

Types of schools

Legacy

From 1970s/80s to 2011/12

From 2012/13 to present

Class size

In early days, many primary schools in Hong Kong offered half-day schooling, splitting by AM and PM to handle the demand. The two sessions were usually treated as separate school entities with two different headmasters. To make up for the time of shortened half days, students were sometimes required to attend alternate Saturdays. Most primary schools are gradually moving to full school day systems as government policy aims to phase out half-day schooling over time as resource permits.

Due to the drop in birth rate in recent years, many primary schools were forced to cut classes, cut teachers and even close down. There have been debates that one should seize the opportunity to promote small class teaching, in order to mitigate the pressure of teachers, class and school reductions, on top of improving ratio of students to teachers.

Discipline

Good behaviour has always been emphasised in Hong Kong, to the point that it is sometimes said to hinder pupils' development. Misbehaviour is recorded and shown on school reports. The Education Bureau (EDB) provides the 'Guidelines for Student Disciplines' to schools to as guidance in creating a disciplined education environment. It outlines the principles and policies regarding student discipline, the organisational structure of a school discipline team, the roles and responsibilities of the discipline master and mistress, and discipline strategies illustrated with case studies.

Criticisms

Spoon feeding

Education in Hong Kong has often been described as 'spoon fed'. Cram schools in Hong Kong have also become a popular standard in parallel to regular education. Teachers focus on helping students getting high scores in the major exams and heavily rely on textbook knowledge rather than exchanging ideas and essence of the subjects.

1998－2012 Education reform

With the advent of education reform there is a greater emphasis on group projects, open-ended assignments on top of traditional homework. The current workload of a primary student in Hong Kong includes approximately two hours of schoolwork nightly. Along with extra-curricular activities, Hong Kong's education has become synonymous for leaning towards quantity. As early as March 1987, education advisory inspectors became concerned with the excessive amounts of "mechanical work and meaningless homework". In particular, history education has been recognised as ineffective, with critics claiming that the curriculum is not capable of delivering a sense of identity. Not only that, students have to memorise the whole history texts, thereby indicating that rote-learning has greater priority than absorbing and understanding material.

Some  have criticised the system for having too narrow of a stream focus, too early on. Legco Member Alan Leong argued in a guest lecture at the Chinese University of Hong Kong that secondary level science students are incapable of participating in meaningful discussions on history, arts, or literature. Vice versa journalists of arts stream background are incapable of accurately discussing technological issues. The narrow focus of education in Hong Kong has been a concern.

The pervasive perception from observers in overseas education institutions generally is that a typical Hong Kong student compared with other students, even against other students in the Asia region, lacks systematic decision-making confidence and relies on repetition and undeveloped answers. This deviates from the common benchmark of intellect where value propositions are generated from innovation and distinctive solutions, and this has led to much schism in the debate of educational direction of Hong Kong, where the populace makes no such aspiration for intellect but seek constant reaffirmation of the value of myriad certificates obtained through pedagogy throughout their working lives. The desperation to seek standing in life through education is further highlighted by severe ironies such as:

 Senior education officials often acclaim the excellence of Hong Kong education, yet few if any will let their children matriculate locally, preferring overseas universities instead.
 A certificate driven society that takes pride in its academic excellence is unable to devise a suitable benchmark of excellence itself, with a low public approval of the local educational system, relies on certification from outside Hong Kong.

See also
 Education by country
 Education in the UK
 Education in the People's Republic of China
 List of schools in Hong Kong
 List of universities in Hong Kong
 334 Scheme (New Senior Secondary Scheme)
 EMI schools

References

Further reading
 
Tang, Kwok-Chun (Hong Kong Baptist University) and Mark Bray (University of Hong Kong). "Colonial models and the evolution of education systems: centralization and decentralization in Hong Kong and Macau." World Bank.
Chan, Anita K.W. and Lucille L.S. Ngan. "Investigating the differential mobility experiences of Chinese cross-border students." Mobilities. Volume 13, 2018. Issue 1. p. 142-156. DOI 10.1080/17450101.2017.1300452.

 - Occasional Paper No. 12

External links

Education Bureau, Government of Hong Kong Special Administrative Region

 
Secondary education by country